American musician Santi White, better known by her stage name Santigold (formerly Santogold), has released four studio albums, two mixtapes, one extended play (EP), and twenty-two singles (including eight as a featured artist). White's discography under the name Santogold consists of her eponymous debut album, six singles, one mixtape, and four music videos, all of which were released in 2008, except the single "Creator", which was released in late 2007. Santogold peaked at number 74 on the Billboard 200, and reached numbers 2 and 6 on Billboards Dance/Electronic Albums and Independent Albums, respectively. The album also charted in Belgium, France, the Netherlands, and the United Kingdom.

In 2009, White changed her stage name from Santogold to Santigold due to legal issues, and released a live EP via iTunes, which peaked at number 20 on Billboards Dance/Electronic Albums chart. The same year, Santigold collaborated with N.E.R.D and Julian Casablancas on the non-album single "My Drive Thru", made as part of an advertising campaign by Converse. She has also made guest appearances on numerous albums by other artists such as Jay-Z, N.A.S.A., and Drake, and has produced and written music for many other artists, including Christina Aguilera, Ashlee Simpson, GZA, Lily Allen, and Res.

Her second studio album, Master of My Make-Believe (2012), topped the Dance/Electronic Albums chart and reached number 21 on the Billboard 200. In the following two years, she contributed to various soundtracks, including The Hunger Games: Catching Fire, The Heat, Girls and Paper Towns. Her third studio album, 99¢, was released in 2016, and her first officially released mixtape, I Don't Want: The Gold Fire Sessions, in 2018.

This discography covers White's solo career, and therefore does not include her work with the band Stiffed on their 2005 album Burned Again and their 2003 extended play Sex Sells.

Albums

Studio albums

Mixtapes

Extended plays

Singles

As lead artist

As featured artist

Guest appearances

Credits

Music videos

Notes

References
General

 
 

Specific

External links

Discographies of American artists
Rock music discographies
Pop music discographies